Hermine Horiot (born 14 May 1986) is a French cellist.

Life 
Born in Dijon, Horiot studied the cello from the age of six, which she continued at the age of fifteen at the Conservatoire de Paris.

She collaborates with artists such as Laurent Korcia, Cyprien Katsaris and Ferenc Vizi.
She plays on a 1874 Miremont cello.

Discography 
 Romance Oubliée with Ferenc Vizi.

Awards 
Horiot won the first prize in the Vatelot-Rampal competition, she is the winner of the 2012  and of the "Fondation Banque populaire".

References

External links 
 1 hour long program dedicated to Hermine Horiot on 24 November 2013, France Musique
 Arvo Pārt - Fratres / Hermine Horiot (Adaptation for cello and electronics) (YouTube)

1986 births
Living people
Musicians from Dijon
French classical cellists
Conservatoire de Paris alumni
Academic staff of the Conservatoire de Paris
21st-century French women musicians
Women music educators
21st-century cellists